The Penang State Executive Council is the executive authority of the state government of Penang, a Malaysian state. Led by the Chief Minister, the head of government who is appointed by Penang's head of state, the Governor, the Executive Council also comprises between four and ten other State Assemblymen from the Penang State Legislative Assembly, as well as the State Secretary, the State Legal Adviser and the State Financial Officer.

While being smaller in size, the Penang State Executive Council is analogous in structure and role to the Malaysian Federal Cabinet. As federal and state responsibilities differ, there are a number of portfolios that differ between the federal and state governments. The Executive Council is collectively responsible to the Penang State Legislative Assembly.

Structure of government

Appointment of the Executive 
The Chief Minister, as Penang's head of government, must be appointed by the Governor of Penang (Malay: Yang di-Pertua Negeri Pulau Pinang) on the basis that the former commands the confidence of a majority of the State Assemblymen in the Penang State Legislative Assembly. On the advice of the Chief Minister, the Governor shall form the Penang State Executive Council by appointing "not more than ten nor less than four other members" from among the State Assemblymen.

Aside from the Executive Council, the Governor shall also appoint another three executive officers, namely the State Secretary, the State Legal Adviser and the State Financial Officer.

 The State Secretary serves as the principal officer who handles the administrative affairs of the State.
 The State Legal Adviser shall provide advice on legal matters upon request from either the Governor or the state government.
 The State Financial Officer is in charge of the financial affairs of the State.

These officers retain the right to participate in the proceedings of the Executive Council and may be appointed to any of the committees in the council. However, they are not permitted to vote in the Executive Council or within any of the committees.

Before exercising the duties of the executive office, an incoming member of the Executive Council must take and subscribe the Oath of Office and Allegiance in the presence of the Governor. The Oath of Office and Allegiance reads as follows.I, [name], having been appointed to the office of [name of office], do solemnly swear [or affirm] that I will faithfully discharge the duties of that office to the best of my ability, that I will bear true faith and allegiance to the State of Penang, and that I will preserve, protect and defend the Constitution of the State of Penang.In addition, every incoming member of the Executive Council, plus the State Secretary, the State Legal Adviser and the State Financial Officer, must also take and subscribe the Oath of Secrecy before the Governor. The Oath of Secrecy is as follows.I, [name], do solemnly swear [or affirm] that I will not directly or indirectly communicate or reveal to any person any matter which shall be brought under my consideration or shall become known to me as a member of the Executive Council of the State of Penang except as may be required for the due discharge of my duties as such or may be specially permitted by the Yang di-Pertua Negeri.

Vacation of office 
Any member of the Penang State Executive Council, apart from the Chief Minister, shall hold office at the Governor's pleasure, but may at any time resign from his or her position. If the Chief Minister ceases to command the confidence of the majority of the State Assemblymen in the Penang State Legislative Assembly, the Chief Minister shall tender the resignation of the entire Executive Council. However, in this particular circumstance, the Chief Minister also reserves the option to advise the Governor to dissolve the Legislative Assembly, thus paving the way for fresh state-level election. Aside from that, the Executive Council ceases to exist upon the vacancy of the Office of the Chief Minister, unless the vacancy arises while the Legislative Assembly is dissolved.

Current Executive Council members 

Following the 2018 State Election, the composition of the Penang State Executive Council is as follows.

Ex officio members 
The State Secretary, the State Legal Adviser and the State Financial Officer are the ex officio members of the Executive Council.

See also 
 Penang state government
 Governor of Penang
 Chief Minister of Penang
 Penang State Legislative Assembly

References

External links 
 Penang State Government

Politics of Penang
Penang